The United States is one of the biggest paper consumers in the world.  Between 1990 and 2002, paper consumption in the United States increased from 84.9 million tons to 97.3 million tons. In 2006, there were approximately 450 paper mills in the United States, accounting for $68 billion.

Leading companies 
The top 10 forest and paper products companies in net sales in the United States in 2012 were:

Manufacturing statistics

Exports

See also
Environmental issues with paper
Toilet paper in the United States
Wood industry

References

External links 
 TAPPI Technical Association of the Pulp and Paper Industry
 American Forest and Paper Association
 EPA profile of the pulp and paper industry

 
Industry in the United States